Hamilton Cemetery on York Boulevard in Hamilton, Ontario, is the oldest public burial ground in the city. It is located on Burlington Heights, a high sand and gravel isthmus that separates Hamilton's harbor on the east from Cootes Paradise on the west.

Historically, the cemetery consists of three, separate burial grounds over 100 acres: Burlington Heights Cemetery, the Christ Church Grounds, and the Church of Ascension Grounds. It has been a contentious issue whether a flood, which around the 1860s inundated the city, necessitated the recollection of gravestones to be amassed in one place.

From 1850 until 1892, each burial ground was administered separately, but by the beginning of the 1890s, the church wardens had difficulty paying for the maintenance and upkeep of their areas. In 1892, the City of Hamilton agreed to assume responsibility for all the grounds, which were renamed "Hamilton Cemetery".

Notable plots

Mayors
Thirty-three mayors of Hamilton are buried/interred here, including:

 Colin Campbell Ferrie (1808–1856)
 John Rose Holden (1821–1879)
 James Cummings (1815–1894)
 Charles Magill
 John Francis Moore (1816–1870)
 George Hamilton Mills
 Benjamin Ernest Charlton (1835–1901)
 Hutchison Clark (1806–1877)
 James Edwin O'Reilly (1833–1907)
 George Murison
 George Roach
 Francis Edwin Kilvert
 John James Mason
 Alexander McKay
 William Doran
 David McLellan
 Peter Campbell Blaicher
 George Elias Tuckett (1835–1900)
 Edward Alexander Colquhoun
 John Strathearn Hendrie
 Wellington Jeffers Morden
 Sanford Dennis Biggar
 Thomas Joseph Stewart
 George Harmon Lees
 John Allan
 Charles Goodenough Booker
 George Charles Coppley
 Thomas William Jutten
 Freeman Ferrier Treleaven
 William Burton
 John Peebles
 Herbert Earl Wilton
 Samuel Lawrence

Others

 George Hamilton (1788–1836, cenotaph – buried at family plot at Mountainside Park)
 James Gage (1774–1854)
 Peter Hunter Hamilton
 Peter Hess
 Richard Butler
 James Jolley
 Andrew Ross
 William W. Cooke

 Adam Beck – founded the Hydro-Electric Power Commission of Ontario
 Adelaide Hoodless (1858–1910) – founded the Women's Institute
 William Eli Sanford – Senator
 Harcourt Burland Bull – Senator
 Andrew Trew Wood – Senator
 Donald MacInnes – Senator
 Adam Hope – Senator
 John Milne – Senator
 Martha Julia Cartmell – founder of Toyo Eiwa Jogakuin Private Academy for Girls, Japan
 Thomas Stinson
 Hugh Cossart Baker Sr. – founder of the first life insurance company in Canada, the Canada Life Assurance Company
 Hugh Cossart Baker Jr. – telephone pioneer
 Sir John Strathearn Hendrie – 11th Lieutenant Governor of Ontario
 John Charles Fields – mathematician, founder of the Fields Medal
 Thomas McQuesten – politician
 Allan Studholme – politician
 Arthur Crisp – artist
 Hortense Gordon – artist
 George Washington Johnson – lyricist for the popular folk song When You and I Were Young, Maggie

Common stones
A large number of the stones contain masonic symbols, as well as a number of carved tree-stumps. Several family vaults are also found here, including the Sanford Vault, the Tuckett vault, the Thomas C Watkins vault, the Col. Land Family Vault and the Stinson Family Mausoleum. Oddly, there is indication that these crypts are renovations of an existing (ancient) stone building. Even more curious, is that these crypts are half-buried in a mound of earth.

War graves
The cemetery contains the war graves of 139 Commonwealth service personnel, 127 from World War I and 12 from World War II.

References

External links

 Ontario: Hamilton Cemetery, Wentworth County – CanadaGenWeb Cemetery Project
 

Cemeteries in Ontario